Bill Brassey was an English bare-knuckle boxer.

On 26 October 1840 Ben Caunt defeated Bill Brassey at Six Mile Bottom, Cambridgeshire, in 101 rounds.

See also
List of bare-knuckle boxers

Bare-knuckle boxers
English male boxers
Year of death missing
Year of birth missing